Villaroel is a surname. Notable people with the surname include:

Carmina Villaroel (born 1975), Filipino actress, television host, and model
Kevon Villaroel (born 1987), Trinidadian soccer player